Spook Cave is a flooded cave located about  west of McGregor in rural Clayton County, Iowa. It is privately owned and operated as a tourist attraction offering escorted boat rides into the cave. The cave was first discovered in 1953 and opened for business in 1955.

The cave entrance is located on a  property that also includes a campground and cabins.

The cave is in the drainage of Bloody Run Creek, a small tributary of the Upper Mississippi River. A lock and dam maintain water levels sufficient for boat access; the cave's stream is allowed to drain to its natural, shin-high depth during the winter. Geologically, the cave is in the Driftless Area of Iowa, a region characterized by karst topography, caves, sinkholes, disappearing streams, and cold springs.

References

External links
 
Spook Cave and Campground Official site

Caves of Iowa
Landforms of Clayton County, Iowa
Driftless Area
Show caves in the United States
Limestone caves
Tourist attractions in Clayton County, Iowa